Zeydan may refer to:
 Zeydan, Bushehr
 Zeydan, Khuzestan
 Zeydan, alternate name of Cham, Behbahan, Khuzestan province
 Zeydan, South Khorasan
 Zeydan, West Azerbaijan

See also
 Zaidan (disambiguation)
 Zeydun (disambiguation)